Brandt Channing Louie (born 5 July 1943) OBC is a Canadian accountant and businessman. He is the President and CEO of H.Y. Louie Co. Limited (distributor to IGA stores in British Columbia), and Chairman of London Drugs Limited.

Early life and education
Louie was born in Vancouver and earned his bachelor of commerce from the University of British Columbia (UBC).

H.Y. Louie Group
After practicing as a chartered accountant, Louie decided to join his family business in 1972. In 1903, Louie's grandfather, who had immigrated to Canada from China, founded a general store in Vancouver. He was eventually named Chairman and Chief Executive Officer of London Drugs in 1998.

As CEO and Chairman, Louie also oversees the Tong and Geraldine Louie Family Foundation and the London Drugs Foundation. In 2010, he was appointed Chairman of Grosvenor Americas Board of Directors.

Chancellorship
In 2002, Louie replaced Evaleen Jaager Roy as Chair of the Simon Fraser University Board of Governors. A few years later, in 2005, Louie was appointed chancellor of Simon Fraser University (SFU).

Awards and honours
In 2009, Louie was made a Member of the Order of British Columbia. 

In 2012, he was inducted into the Canadian Business Hall of Fame. The following year, the University of Victoria honoured him as a Distinguished Entrepreneur. A few years later, he was the recipient of the EY Family Business Award of Excellence. In 2016, he was the recipient of an honorary degree from UBC.

References

1943 births
Living people
Businesspeople from Vancouver
Canadian accountants
Canadian billionaires
Canadian people of Chinese descent
Canadian philanthropists
Canadian retail chief executives
Directors of Royal Bank of Canada
Harvard Kennedy School people
London Drugs
Members of the Order of British Columbia
Duke University trustees
Simon Fraser University people
UBC Sauder School of Business alumni